Hickory Dickory Dock is a work of detective fiction by Agatha Christie and first published in the UK by the Collins Crime Club on 31 October 1955 and in the US by Dodd, Mead and Company in November of the same year under the title of Hickory Dickory Death. The UK edition retailed at ten shillings and sixpence (10/6) and the US edition at $3.00. It features her Belgian detective Hercule Poirot. The novel is notable for featuring Poirot's efficient secretary, Miss Felicity Lemon, who had previously appeared only in the Poirot short stories.

This novel is set at a student hostel. Poirot is initially asked to investigate petty thefts and vandalism in the hostel, and easily discovers that most of these acts were committed by resident Celia Austin. Then Celia is murdered.

Plot summary

An outbreak of apparent kleptomania at a student hostel arouses Hercule Poirot's interest when he sees the bizarre list of stolen and vandalised items. These include a stethoscope, some lightbulbs, some old flannel trousers, a box of chocolates, a slashed rucksack, some boracic powder and a diamond ring later found in a bowl of soup – he congratulates the warden, Mrs Hubbard, on a 'unique and beautiful problem'. Poirot's solution of the petty thefts is unsubtle but effective: once he has threatened to call in the police, Celia Austin quickly confesses to the pettier incidents. She denies, however, the following: stealing Nigel Chapman's green ink and using it to deface Elizabeth Johnston's work; taking the stethoscope, the light bulbs and boracic powder; and cutting up and concealing a rucksack. She committed the lesser thefts to attract the attention of Colin McNabb, a psychology student who then becomes engaged to her. She makes restitution for the crimes and reconciles with her victims. The more important incidents remain unsolved. Celia is discovered dead the following morning from an overdose of morphine. It does not take investigators long to see that her death is murder.

Inspector Sharpe solves the mystery of the stolen stethoscope during his interviews with the inhabitants of the hostel. Nigel Chapman admits to having stolen the stethoscope to pose as a doctor and steal some morphine tartrate from the hospital dispensary as part of a bet to acquire three deadly poisons (the other two being digitalin and hyoscine). He claims the poisons were carefully disposed of, but cannot be sure that the morphine was not stolen from him while it was in his possession. Poirot turns his attention to the reappearance of the diamond ring, and confronts Valerie Hobhouse, in whose soup the ring was found. It seems that the diamond had been replaced with a zircon and that only Valerie could place it in the dish of soup; Poirot accuses her of having stolen the diamond. She admits to having done so, saying that she needed the money to pay off gambling debts. She also admits to having planted in Celia Austin's mind the idea of the thefts.

Mrs Nicoletis is behaving very nervously. She is killed by drinking poisoned brandy. Poirot focuses his attention now on the cutting up of the rucksack. By careful study of the rucksack's design, he identifies an unusual corrugated base, and suggests to the police that the rucksack is part of an international smuggling operation. The rucksacks were sold to innocent students, and then used to transport drugs and gems. Mrs Nicoletis had been bankrolling the organisation, but was not the brain behind it. When the police visited Hickory Road on an unconnected issue, the murderer had cut up the rucksack to avoid its being found and removed light bulbs to avoid being recognised.

Patricia Lane comes to Nigel and admits that she has taken the morphine from the bottle in his drawer and substituted for it bicarbonate of soda. Now the bottle of bicarbonate of soda has been taken from her own drawer. While they are searching for this bottle she mentions that she is intending to write to his father to reconcile the two. Nigel tells her that the reason for his estrangement from his father is that he discovered that his father had poisoned his mother with Medinal, a trade name for barbitone sodium. This is why he changed his name and carries two passports. Nigel goes to Inspector Sharpe and tells him about the missing morphine, but while he is there, Patricia telephones to say that she has discovered something further. By the time that Nigel and Sharpe get to the house, she is dead, killed by a blow to the head. Akibombo comes to Sharpe and says that he had taken Patricia's bicarbonate to ease a stomach complaint; when he took a teaspoonful of the bicarbonate, however, he had stomach pains and later discovered that the white powder was in fact the boracic powder. By the time Patricia had substituted the bicarbonate, the morphine had already been substituted by the stolen boracic powder. Poirot's suspicions about Valerie Hobhouse's role in the smuggling operation are proved correct by a police raid on her beauty shop.

The murderer is Nigel Chapman, who was known to have the morphine in his possession. He killed Celia because she knew about his dual identity and also knew that Valerie travelled abroad on a false passport. He killed Mrs Nicoletis because she was sure to give the smuggling operation away under pressure, and killed Patricia because she was likely to draw his father's attention to the recent events, as she was on the verge of writing a letter to him in the hope of reconciling him with his son before his death. When Poirot outlines to Nigel's father's solicitor the case against Nigel, the solicitor provides final proof. Nigel's mother had been poisoned, not by his father, but by Nigel. When the father discovered this ( is a poison slow to act, and the mother told her husband), he forced him to write a confession and left it with his solicitor together with a letter explaining that it should be presented to the authorities in case of any further wrongdoing by Nigel. Valerie placed the call to the police station, which had apparently come from Patricia, to establish an alibi for Nigel who had already bludgeoned Patricia. The green ink was a double-bluff intended to divert suspicion away from him. Valerie is willing to incriminate Nigel fully because Mrs Nicoletis was actually her mother.

Characters
 Hercule Poirot, the Belgian detective
 Inspector Sharpe, the investigating officer
 Miss Felicity Lemon, Poirot's secretary
 Mrs Christina Nicoletis, the part-Greek, dipsomaniac owner of the student hostel at Hickory Road
 Mrs Hubbard, Miss Lemon's sister and the warden of Hickory Road
 George, Poirot's valet
 Ahmed Ali, an Egyptian student residing at Hickory Road
 Akibombo, a West African student residing at Hickory Road
 Celia Austin, a resident in full-time employment at Hickory Road, chemist in the dispensary at St Catherines Hospital.
 Leonard "Len" Bateson, a student residing at Hickory Road, studying medicine and surgery
 Nigel Chapman, a student residing at Hickory Road, he has a diploma in Bronze Age and medieval history as well as Italian, and studies at the University of London
 Sally Finch, an American student residing at Hickory Road under the Fulbright Program, specializing in poetry
 René Halle, a French student residing at Hickory Road, studying English literature
 Valèrie Hobhouse, a resident at Hickory Road in full-time employment as co-owner of Sabrina Fair, a beauty parlour
 Elizabeth Johnston, a Jamaican student residing at Hickory Road, studying jurisprudence
 Chandra Lal, an Indian student residing at Hickory Road studying political science
 Patricia Lane, a student residing at Hickory Road with a diploma in archaeology
 Geneviève Maricaud, a French student residing at Hickory Road studying English literature
 Colin McNabb, a student residing at Hickory Road, doing post-graduate studies in psychology
 Gopal Ram, an Indian student residing at Hickory Road studying political science
 Jean Tomlinson, a resident at Hickory Road in full-time employment doing physical therapy at St Catherine's Hospital
 Maria, the Italian cook at Hickory Road
 Geronimo, Maria's husband, also a cook

Explanation of the novel's title
The title is taken, as are other of Christie's titles, from a nursery rhyme: Hickory Dickory Dock. This is nevertheless one of her most tenuous links to the original nursery rhyme, consisting of little more than the name of a road and an allusion being "in the dock," i.e. on trial. (“‘Hickory, dickory, dock,’ said Nigel, ‘the mouse ran up the clock. The police said, “Boo,” I wonder who, will eventually stand in the Dock?’”).

Literary significance and reception
Philip John Stead's review in the Times Literary Supplement of 23 December 1955 began: "Poirot's return to the happy hunting grounds of detective fiction is something of an event. He is called upon to solve the mystery of a series of apparently trivial thefts at a student's hostel but soon finds himself partnering the police in investigating murder. Mrs Christie rapidly establishes her favourite atmosphere by her skilful mixture of cheerfulness and suspense." After summarising the plot he concluded, "The amount of mischief going on in the hostel imposes some strain on the reader's patience as well as on Poirot's ingenuity; the author has been a little too liberal with the red herrings. Yet the thumb-nail sketches of the characters are as good as ever and in spite of the over-elaborate nature of the puzzle there is plenty of entertainment."

Robert Barnard: "A significant falling-off in standards in this mid-'fifties story. A highly perfunctory going-through-the-paces: the rhyme has no meaning within the story; the plot (drugs smuggled in imported haversacks) is unlikely in the extreme; and the attempt to widen the range of character types (Africans, Indians, students of Freud etc.) is far from successful. Evelyn Waugh's diary records that it 'began well' but deteriorated 'a third of the way through into twaddle' – a judgment which, unusually for him, erred on the side of charity."

References or allusions

References to other works
When the students are attempting to place Hercule Poirot, during Chapter 4, one of them mentions the case retold in Mrs McGinty's Dead (1952). When Poirot comes to lecture to the students about his cases in the same chapter, he retells the story of The Nemean Lion, published in book form in The Labours of Hercules (1947). In chapter 5 Poirot also remembers Count Vera Rossakoff's "exotic splendour...even in decay", something that he has only observed in The Capture of Cerberus, also from The Labours of Hercules. In Chapter 21, Poirot visits a solicitor by the name of Mr Endicott to confirm his suspicions of Nigel Chapman. Endicott says to Poirot, "...I'm deeply in your debt. You cleared up that nasty Abernethy business for me." This may be a reference to the events in After the Funeral (1953), though Abernethie is mistakenly spelt "Abernethy" and not "Abernethie" as it is in After the Funeral. Furthermore, the catalyst to Poirot's direct involvement to the events in After the Funeral is a solicitor named Entwhistle, not Endicott.

References to actual history, geography and current science
In Chapter 11, Elizabeth Johnston refers to anti-Communist “witch hunts” in America. The term was first used in its metaphorical sense in 1938, but its specific connection with McCarthyism dates from the first performance of Arthur Miller's play, The Crucible, in 1953. This implies that the setting of the novel is at most two years before its publication.

Television adaptations
British 
A television adaptation, starring David Suchet as Poirot; Philip Jackson as Inspector Japp; Pauline Moran as Miss Lemon; Damian Lewis as Leonard Bateson; Sarah Badel as Mrs Hubbard; Elinor Morriston as Valerie Hobhouse and Jonathan Firth as Nigel Chapman, was broadcast in 1995 in the series Agatha Christie's Poirot. In common with the rest of the series, the setting is moved back in time from the post-World War II period of Christie's original novel to the 1930s. This results in an anachronism: the American student Sally Finch is said to be on a Fulbright scholarship, though the Fulbright Program was not founded until after the Second World War.

This adaptation differed from Christie's novel in that Sharpe is replaced with the recurring character of Inspector Japp, and a number of the students from the novel are left out, most notably Akibombo, Elizabeth Johnston, and Lal, who are students but neither English nor American. Other aspects omitted from the TV adaptation include the red herring of the green ink, the change of the motive for the murder of Celia, the theft of the poison being the only thing taken and the person who takes it (McNabb) and the smuggling involving only diamonds, the inclusion of a Custom and Excise Officer conducting an undercover operation, and the relationship between Valerie and Mrs Nicoletis. 

French 
The novel was also adapted as a 2015 episode of the French television series Les Petits Meurtres d'Agatha Christie.

Publication history
 1955, Collins Crime Club (London), 31 October 1955, Hardcover, 192 pp
 1955, Dodd Mead and Company (New York), November 1955, Hardcover, 241 pp
 1956, Pocket Books (New York), Paperback, 222 pp
 1958, Fontana Books (Imprint of HarperCollins), Paperback, 192 pp
 1967, Pan Books, Paperback, 189 pp
 1987, Ulverscroft Large-print Edition, Hardcover, 

In the UK the novel was first serialised in the weekly magazine John Bull in six abridged instalments from 28 May (Volume 97, Number 2552) to 2 July 1955 (Volume 98, Number 2557) with illustrations by "Fancett".

The novel was first serialised in the US in Collier's Weekly in three abridged instalments from 14 October (Volume 136, Number 8) to 11 November 1955 (Volume 136, Number 10) under the title Hickory Dickory Death with illustrations by Robert Fawcett.

References

External links
Hickory Dickory Dock at the official Agatha Christie website

1955 British novels
Hercule Poirot novels
Works originally published in John Bull (magazine)
Novels first published in serial form
Collins Crime Club books
British novels adapted into television shows